Cedar Hill Village is a rural community in Trinidad and Tobago which covers an area of approximately four square kilometres. It is about two kilometres from Princes Town. It can be found along the Manahambre Road.

Climate

The city has a Tropical Wet and dry climate characterised by high Year round temperature and the last six months of the year being the wettest. The rainiest months are from June to November. In the rainy season flooding is quite common in Downtown and other city districts surrounding Cedar Hill Village.

Sources
Trinidad and Tobago Gazette

References

Villages in Trinidad and Tobago